Ruhul Kabir Rizvi Ahmed is a Bangladeshi politician who is currently serving as a senior joint secretary general of Bangladesh Nationalist Party (BNP). He is also the office secretary and acting as a spokesperson of the BNP's central office located at Naya Paltan in Dhaka.

Early life
Ruhul Kabir Rizvi Ahmed was born in Kurigram District. He completed higher secondary education from Rajshahi College and obtained LL.B. degree from Department of Law, University of Rajshahi.

Career
Rizvi entered students politics through an organization named "Leftist Revolutionary Student Union". He then joined Bangladesh Jatiotabadi Chatra Dal and later became its central president. He was elected BNP's senior joint secretary general on 19 March 2016.

Personal life
Rizvi is married to Anjuman Ara.

References

Living people
People from Kurigram District
Bangladesh Nationalist Party politicians
Year of birth missing (living people)